Dobrowo  is a village in the administrative district of Gmina Tychowo, within Białogard County, West Pomeranian Voivodeship, in north-western Poland.

For the history of the region, see History of Pomerania.

The village has a population of 770.

Notable residents
 Ewald von Kleist-Schmenzin (1890 – 1945), resistance fighter

References

Dobrowo